The Renault Eolab is a concept car plug-in hybrid designed by the French car manufacturer Renault. It was unveiled to the press in September 2014, prior to its formal unveiling at the Paris Motor Show.

Overview

The supermini sized Eolab hybrid demonstrates nearly 100 production-destined technological innovations, which will appear on future models by 2020. It is powered by a 1.0-litre, I3 petrol engine producing , paired with a  ‘axial flux discoid’ electric motor located in the clutch casing. All power is delivered to the front wheels via a three-speed gearbox. A small 6.7kWh lithium ion battery pack is attached to the system, providing  on electric power .

The Eolab features two driving modes: weekday, which emphasises low emissions, and an alternative ‘weekend’ mode uses both power units together to greater performance and range. The resulting  emissions are a low at 22 g/km.

The car also incorporates three ride-height levels which lowers the car and reduced drag, working in conjunction with active aero on the wheel trims (on narrow 145 mm tyres) and spoilers reduce the drag coefficient to 0.235 .

See also 
 Renault Z.E.

References

Eolab
Front-wheel-drive vehicles
Eolab
Cars introduced in 2014
Subcompact cars
Hatchbacks